Chadwickryggen is a mountain on Spitsbergen in Svalbard, Norway. It is located west of Wijdefjorden between Smutsbreen and Tryggvebreen in Ny-Friesland. It is named for the English physicist James Chadwick (1891–1974).

References

Mountains of Spitsbergen